Psoroglaena dictyospora is a species of fungus belonging to the family Verrucariaceae.

It is native to Europe and North America.

References

Verrucariales